St Peter's Church is a 12th-century Roman Catholic parish church in Liverdun, Meurthe-et-Moselle, France. It has been classified a monument historique by the Ministry of Culture since 1924.

Location 

The church stands at the heart of the upper town, which had fortifications in the Middle Ages. Its entrance portal looks out onto a square on which stand a mission cross and the portal of the clergy house, both classified monuments historiques as well.

History 
St Peter's Church is a former collegiate church with a Romanesque tower and a modern belltower. Its 12th-century nave and side aisles have capitals. The transept also dates back to the 12 century; yet its chevet was modified in the 18th and 19th centuries.

The church houses the tombstone of Saint Euchaire— a 16th-century Renaissance gisant in a funeral niche. The interior is also decorated with 18th-century paintings and old mural paintings.

The building was classified a monument historique by an order on November 25th, 1924.

Organs 
As the pipe organs were in poor condition, a new order was passed to Claude Ignace Callinet. However, the current organ is still in its original state. Its instrumental part is still used today and has been a classified monument historique since 1984.

Portals 

The western portal was modified but a part of the old sculpture is still visible today.

Photographs

References 

Churches in Meurthe-et-Moselle
Monuments historiques of Grand Est
Romanesque architecture in France
12th-century Roman Catholic church buildings in France